The following is a list of national parks in Turkey.

History 
The concept of a national park was introduced for the first time in Turkey by Selahattin İnal, who argued that "nature reserves should have the status of a national park and they should be determined according to natural beauty and touristic potential criteria." The concept was included in the 25th article of the Forest Law adopted on 31 August 1956, and was included in the legal plane for the first time. The General Directorate of Forestry, which is given the responsibility of the national parks by law, is authorized to declare a national park for the purpose of using it as a scientific and public sports and recreation area, provided that the fauna and flora of the forested areas are preserved. Until 1983, only areas that had forest cover fell within the category of national parks, but the National Parks Law, which was adopted on 9 August 1983, new protection statuses such as nature parks, nature preserve areas, and nature monuments were established and areas with historical, touristic or cultural values could now be declared as national parks even if they were not covered by forests.
 According to the current version of the law, the declaration of a new national park falls within the powers of the Ministry of Agriculture and Forestry, which takes the advice of the Ministry of Environment and Urban Planning on zoning, and the Ministry of Culture and Tourism on historical and touristic matters.

In the cases where the area set to become a national park consists of lands belonging to the public as well as fields belonging to the individuals, the area is taken under the control of the Ministry of Agriculture and Forestry, which can use measures such as expropriation, transfer, allocation or donation under the Expropriation Law. The Ministry of Agriculture and Forestry has the right to organize, manage, or operate national parks. The right to operate is valid only for national parks not covered by the state forests, and the right to operate the state forests cannot be transferred in accordance with article 169 of the constitution. The management of the national parks is directly done by the Directorate of National Parks, a subbranch of the General Directorate of Nature Conservation and National Parks, which itself is controlled by the Ministry of Agriculture and Forestry.

Yozgat Pine Grove National Park, one of the remaining ruins of the ancient forests in Central Anatolia, was declared Turkey's first national park on 5 February 1958. Antalya has the highest number of national parks among the provinces by having five national parks within its boundaries. The last area to be declared a national park was Botan Valley National Park, which was listed on 15 August 2019.

Key

National parks

National parks by province

Former national parks

Map

References 
Inline citations

Sources

External links 

 
 National parks map system

National parks
Turkey
 
National parks